Uncovered is a 1994 thriller film based on Arturo Pérez-Reverte's The Flanders Panel. It was directed by Jim McBride. Kate Beckinsale stars as the main character Julia.

Plot
Julia, an art restorer living in Barcelona, Spain, discovers a painted-over message on a 1471 Flemish masterpiece called La partida de ajedrez (The Chess Game) reading "Qvis Necavit Eqvitem", written in Latin (English: "Who killed the knight?").

With the help of her old friend and father-figure, the flamboyantly homosexual César, who lives at Casa Batlló, and Domenec, a local chess genius Julia found in Park Güell, Julia works to uncover the mystery of a 500-year-old murder. At the same time, however, Julia faces danger of her own, as several people helping her along her search are also murdered.

Cast
Kate Beckinsale as Julia
John Wood as César
Sinéad Cusack as Menchu
Paudge Behan as Domenec
Art Malik as Alvaro
Helen McCrory as Lola
Michael Gough as Don Manuel
Peter Wingfield as Max
Anthony Milner as Inspector
James Villiers as Montegrifo

References

External links
 
 

1994 films
1990s thriller films
British thriller films
Films directed by Jim McBride
Films set in Barcelona
Films shot in Barcelona
Films shot in Spain
Films based on works by Arturo Pérez-Reverte
Films scored by Philippe Sarde
Films about chess
1990s English-language films
1990s British films